Tales of the Riverbank, sometimes called Hammy Hamster and Once Upon a Hamster for the Canadian version, is a British children's television series developed from a Canadian pilot. The original series was later broadcast on Canadian and U.S. television, dubbed by Canadian and US actors for the markets they were to be broadcast in.

The pilot was created by David Ellison and Paul Sutherland, CBC film editors, in 1959. After completing the pilot programme, CBC turned down the production and so Dave Ellison travelled to the BBC in London to show it. The BBC initially commissioned thirteen episodes, but extended this later. A second series was made in colour in the 1970s, narrated by Johnny Morris.

Revival
A later remake was produced by Canada's YTV and Channel 4 in 1995 which ran for three years, and a feature-length film was made in 2008 using puppets rather than live animals.

Format
The programme had human voices in sync with the actions of the live animals, to give the impression that the creatures were performing activities. They lived in a place called "The Riverbank" and operated various artefacts including toy sailboats, cars, and even a diving bell.  Various techniques were used to persuade the animals to do what was required, including smearing jam on the objects they were to handle.  The voices were selected to reflect the personalities of the animals. Each episode ended with the narrator alluding to an event involving the characters, but refusing to elaborate, saying "But that is another story."

The original black and white Tales of the Riverbank series was first shown by the BBC on 3 July 1960 at 4:50 pm. It was originally narrated by Paul Sutherland, but the BBC did not want Canadian accents and so for the BBC showings, all the voices were provided by Johnny Morris. The series was eventually sold to 34 countries around the world.

Telecast and home release
In the U.S., The show also aired on the Animal Planet during the late 1990s and early 2000s.

UK VHS releases

UK DVD releases

US DVD releases

Further episodes
After the original thirteen episodes, 39 further episodes were made in black-and-white. The majority were written by David Ellison, Charles Fullman, Paul Sutherland and Cliff Braggins. The episodes of Tales of the Riverbank purchased by the BBC were adapted by staff writer Peggy Miller. Much of the filming was done on location at Wootton Creek on the Isle of Wight.

A later series with 26 episodes was filmed in colour in the 1970s, retitled Hammy Hamster (full title: Hammy Hamster's Adventures On the Riverbank) launched in 1972. The BBC had introduced a policy of not using human voices for live animals and so this series was shown in the UK by ITV. In Australia, the show aired on ABC TV through the 1970s as Adventures on the River Bank.

The final series, dubbed Further Tales of the Riverbank, made from 1991 to 1992, was produced for WTTV and Channel 4; 26 episodes of that series were made.  It is ranked 79th in Channel 4's 2001 poll of the 100 Greatest Kids' TV shows. This series was the only one to have been released on DVD, in a set of three DVDs published in-house by Hammytime Productions UK.

In America, Once Upon A Hamster was broadcast in a late-night slot, which helped the programme transcend its intended audience and develop a cult status among US viewers.

The late Dave Ellison launched his own website  to regularly update information about Hammy Hamster and his friends. He was also involved with optimising the TV show, last shown on Channel 4, for release on DVD.

Three children's books were published by Scholastic Publications Ltd in 1993 based on the series and illustrated by Pauline Hazelwood.

Main characters
In the later series the list of characters was expanded from the original first three listed below.

Feature film
A feature-length film, also titled Tales of the Riverbank, was released in September 2008 directly to DVD. It used a mix of puppets, live action, and special effects. Directed by John Henderson, produced by Handmade Pictures and starring Stephen Fry as Owl, Ardal O'Hanlon as Hammy, Steve Coogan as Roderick and Jim Broadbent as G. P., the story follows three friends who live in a riverbank. After being swept away from their homes by a storm, they embark on an adventure to find their home and save it from the danger of the Fat Cats' factory.

US news broadcast accidental reference
A publicity image by David Ellison of Hammy Hamster holding a clapperboard made an unexpected appearance on a January 2009 news broadcast regarding the disappearance of a young girl named Molly Bish. During a report regarding the questioning of a potential suspect eight years after the girl's disappearance, an error resulted in the image of Hammy Hamster being shown instead of a photo of the potential suspect.

See also
 Anthropomorphism

Notes

References

External links

 Andante in C by Giuliani
 The Official website of the series 'Further Tales of the Riverbank' Dave Ellison and Hammy Hamster

BBC children's television shows
British children's television series
Channel 4 original programming
ITV children's television shows
Television series about mammals
Television series by Corus Entertainment
Television shows filmed in Toronto
1960s British children's television series
1970s British children's television series
1990s British children's television series
1959 Canadian television series debuts
1972 Canadian television series debuts
1995 Canadian television series debuts
1997 Canadian television series debuts
1950s Canadian children's television series
1960s Canadian children's television series
1970s Canadian children's television series
1990s Canadian children's television series
Black-and-white British television shows
Black-and-white Canadian television shows
Fictional cavies
Fictional hamsters
English-language television shows